Deliradev Point (‘Deliradev Nos’ \de-'li-ra-dev 'nos\) is the point forming the south side of the entrance to Galata Cove and the north side of the entrance to Lapeyrère Bay on the northeast coast of Anvers Island in the Palmer Archipelago, Antarctica.

The point is named after the Bulgarian geographer, mountaineer and publicist Pavel Deliradev (1879-1957).

Location
British mapping in 1980.

Maps
 British Antarctic Territory.  Scale 1:200000 topographic map.  DOS 610 Series, Sheet W 64 62.  Directorate of Overseas Surveys, UK, 1980.
 Antarctic Digital Database (ADD). Scale 1:250000 topographic map of Antarctica. Scientific Committee on Antarctic Research (SCAR). Since 1993, regularly upgraded and updated.

References
 Bulgarian Antarctic Gazetteer. Antarctic Place-names Commission. (details in Bulgarian, basic data in English)
 Deliradev Point. SCAR Composite Antarctic Gazetteer.
 Punta Gourdon. SCAR Composite Antarctic Gazetteer.
 Punta Bonete. SCAR Composite Antarctic Gazetteer.

External links
 Deliradev Point. Copernix satellite image

Headlands of the Palmer Archipelago
Bulgaria and the Antarctic